Southeastern Local High School, also known as Southeastern High School, is the public school high school in South Charleston, Ohio.  It is part of Southeastern Local Schools, which consists of Southeastern High School and Miami View Elementary School.  The district's average daily student enrollment for the 2008–2009 school year was 849.  The Ohio Department of Education has rated Southeastern as an "Effective" district for the 2008–2009 school year; the district met 28 out of 30 state indicators.

Athletics
Southeastern's mascot is the Trojan.  School colors are scarlet and gray.

Ohio High School Athletic Association State Championships

 Boys Golf – 1987
 Boys Track and Field – 1997
 Girls Basketball – 1996

Notable alumni

Justin Chambers, actor and former model
Philip Caldwell, CEO and Chairman of Ford Motor Company
Rowan Ziolo, Case Western Reserve University Student

References

External links
 District Website
ODE School Year Report Card

High schools in Clark County, Ohio
Public high schools in Ohio